Sam Ssimbwa (born 1967) is a Ugandan professional football player and manager.

Career
Played for three clubs: KK Cosmos (1986), KCC FC (1987-1995) and Mbale Heroes FC (1999-2000). Also he played for the Uganda national football team.

He has coached the clubs Health FC (1998), Mbale Heroes FC (1999-2000), Masaka LC FC (2001), Military Police FC (2002), KCC FC (twice 2002 & 2009), Top TV FC (2003-2004), Rwandan ATRACO FC (2006), Express F.C. (2007), Simba SC (2008) and Kenyan Sofapaka F.C. (2009-2010).

Since November until December 2012 he coached the Somalia national football team. Previously he was a head coach of the SC Victoria University. Later he coached the Express F.C. and Rwandan Police F.C. On 1 October 2014 SC Villa appoint Ssimbwa as coach.

Family and children 
Milly Bayiyana 
Rebecca Nakayenga
Faith Nakamanya 
William nakibinge 
Nassuna Sharon
Ssimbwa kauthara

References

1967 births
Living people
Ugandan footballers
Uganda international footballers
Association football midfielders
Kampala Capital City Authority FC players
Ugandan football managers
Expatriate football managers in Rwanda
Expatriate football managers in Kenya
Expatriate football managers in Somalia
Somalia national football team managers
Place of birth missing (living people)
Ugandan expatriate football managers
Ugandan expatriate sportspeople in Somalia
Ugandan expatriate sportspeople in Kenya
Ugandan expatriate sportspeople in Rwanda